A wattle is a fleshy caruncle hanging from various parts of the head or neck in several groups of birds and mammals. Caruncles in birds include those found on the face, wattles, dewlaps, snoods, and earlobes.  Wattles are generally paired structures, but may occur as a single structure when it is sometimes known as a dewlap.  Wattles are frequently organs of sexual dimorphism. In some birds, caruncles are erectile tissue and may or may not have a feather covering.

Wattles are often such a striking morphological characteristic of animals that it features in their common name.  For example, the southern and northern cassowaries are known as the double-wattled and single-wattled cassowary, respectively, and a breed of domestic pig is known as the Red Wattle.

Birds

Function
In birds, wattles are often an ornament for courting potential mates. Large wattles are correlated with high testosterone levels, good nutrition, and the ability to evade predators, which in turn indicates a potentially successful mate. Ornamental organs such as wattles may be associated with genes coding for disease resistance. In umbrellabirds, the wattle serves to amplify the birds' calls.

Examples

Birds with wattles include:
From the neck or throat
 Birds of the genus Casuarius: the northern, southern, and dwarf cassowaries
 Galliformes (e.g., wild turkeys, chickens)
 Some vultures
 Some lapwings
 The male of the wattled starling
 Some Australian wattlebirds (Anthochaera spp.)
 The New Zealand wattlebirds (Callaeidae), which include the kokako, tieke or saddleback, and the huia
The wattled crane (Bugeranus carunculatus)
Three neotropical bellbird species
From below or around the eyes
The African wattle-eye or puffback flycatcher
The wattled jacana (Jacana jacana)
The African wattled lapwing (Vanellus senegallus)
Many male pheasants
Spectacled tyrant
Gracula hill mynas
Muscovy duck (Cairina moschata)
The English carrier pigeon

Mammals
Mammals with wattles include:
Some domestic goats have fleshy, fur-covered protuberances, called tassels, hanging on either side of the throat.
Some domestic pigs, such as the Kunekune, Lithuanian Native pig, and Red Wattle have a fleshy protuberance hanging either side of the throat.

Gallery

See also

 Casque (anatomy)
 Crest (feathers)
 Comb (anatomy) - the fleshy structure present atop the heads of many Galliform species
 Frontal shield
 Gular pouch
 Dubbing (poultry) - wattle amputation

References

Birds
Bird anatomy
Vertebrate anatomy